Peebinga is a town and locality in the Australian state of South Australia. Peebinga was the terminus of the Peebinga railway line which was built in 1914 as part of a major state government project to open up the Murray Mallee for grazing and cropping.

When the railway was built, it terminated in the scrub in the district of Peebinga. The town was later surveyed in 1924 adjacent to the railway station. The current locality of Peebinga includes the historic place of Mootatunga. Mootatunga was the next-to-last stop on the railway line, and is now adjacent to Peebinga Conservation Park and the Browns Well Highway, 5 km west of Peebinga itself. Peebinga was named by Governor of South Australia, Tom Bridges after the district, which had previously been named by Governor Day Bosanquet in 1912 from the Aboriginal name for a rock hole in the area. Mootatunga was the native name for a totem of the tribe. The town was also surveyed in 1924.

The railway closed in 1990. The post office opened in 1926 and closed in 1986. Peebinga school opened in 1938 but is now also closed.

The 2016 Australian census which was conducted in August 2016 reports that Peebinga had a population of 32 people.

Peebinga is located within the federal division of Barker, the state Electoral district of Chaffey and the local government area of the District Council of Loxton Waikerie.

References

Towns in South Australia